The Essendon Football Club, nicknamed the Bombers, is a professional Australian rules football club. The club plays in the Australian Football League (AFL), the game's premier competition. The club was formed by the McCracken family in their Ascot Vale home "Alisa", and while the exact date is unknown, it is generally accepted to have been in 1872. The club's first recorded game took place on 7 June 1873 against a Carlton Second 20. From 1878 until 1896, the club played in the Victorian Football Association, then joined seven other clubs in October 1896 to form the breakaway Victorian Football League (later changed to AFL in 1990). Headquartered at the Essendon Recreation Ground, known as Windy Hill, from 1922 to 2013, the club moved to The Hangar in near Tullamarine in late 2013 on land owned by the Melbourne Airport. The club currently plays its home games at either Docklands Stadium or the Melbourne Cricket Ground. Zach Merrett is the current club captain.

Essendon is one of Australia's best-known and most successful football clubs. It has won 16 VFL/AFL premierships, which, along with Carlton, is the most of any club in the competition. The club won four consecutive VFA premierships between 1891 and 1894, a feat unmatched in that competition's history. However, Essendon has struggled to remain competitive in the 21st century, having won its last premiership in 2000 and not winning a final since 2004.

During the early-to-mid 2010s, the team was the focus of an investigation by the AFL and independent regulatory bodies into their alleged use of illegal substances during the 2012 season, which led to 34 two-year suspensions, a $2 million fine, and disqualification from the 2013 finals series (among other penalties).

Three Essendon players—John Coleman, Bill Hutchison, and Dick Reynolds—and one coach, Kevin Sheedy, are classified as "Legends" in the Australian Football Hall of Fame.

Essendon also fields reserve men's and women's teams in the Victoria Football League and VFL Women's, respectively. Since 2022, it has a team competing in the national AFL Women's competition.

History

Formation and VFA years (1871–1896) 

The club was founded by members of the Royal Agricultural Society, the Melbourne Hunt Club and the Victorian Woolbrokers. The Essendon Football Club is thought to have been formed in 1872 at a meeting it the home of a well-known brewery family, the McCrackens, whose Ascot Vale property hosted a team of local junior players.

Robert McCracken (1813–1885), the owner of several city hotels, was the founder and first president of the Essendon Football Club, and his son, Alex McCracken, its first secretary. Alex later became president of the newly formed VFL. Alex's cousin Collier McCracken, who had already played with Melbourne, was the team's first captain.

The club played its first recorded match against the Carlton Second Twenty (the reserves) on 7 June 1873, with Essendon winning by one goal. Essendon played 13 matches in its first season, winning seven, with four draws and losing two. The club was one of the inaugural junior members of the Victorian Football Association (VFA) in 1877, and it began competing as a senior club from the 1878 season. During its early years in the Association, Essendon played its home matches at Flemington Hill, but it moved to the East Melbourne Cricket Ground in 1881.

In 1878, at Flemington Hill, Essendon played its first match on what would be considered by modern standards to be a full-sized field. In 1879, Essendon played Melbourne in one of the earliest night matches recorded when the ball was painted white. In 1883, the team played four matches in eight days in Adelaide: losing to Norwood (on 23 June) and defeating Port Adelaide (on 16 June), a combined South Australian team (on 18 June), and South Adelaide (on 20 June).

In 1891, Essendon won their first VFA premiership, which they repeated in 1892, 1893 and 1894. One of the club's greatest players, Albert Thurgood, played for the club during this period, making his debut in 1892. Essendon (18 wins, 2 draws) was undefeated in the 1893 season.

Founding of the VFL to World War I (1897–1915) 

At the end of the 1896 season, Essendon, along with seven other clubs, formed the Victorian Football League. Essendon's first VFL game was in 1897 against Geelong at Corio Oval in Geelong. Essendon won its first VFL premiership by winning the 1897 VFL finals series in a round-robin event. Essendon again won the premiership in 1901, defeating Collingwood in the Grand Final. The club won successive premierships in 1911 and 1912 over Collingwood and South Melbourne, respectively.

"Same Olds" 

The club is recorded as having played at McCracken's Paddock, Glass's Paddock, and Flemington Hill. It is likely that these are three different names for the one ground, given that McCracken's Paddock was a parcel of land that sat within the larger Glass's Paddock, which in turn was situated in an area widely known at the time as Flemington Hill. In 1882, the club moved home games to the East Melbourne Cricket Ground (since demolished) after an application to play on the Essendon Cricket Ground (later known as Windy Hill) was voted down by Lord Mayor of the City of Essendon, James Taylor, on the basis that the considered the Essendon Cricket Ground "to be suitable only for the gentleman's game of cricket".

The club became known by the nickname "the Same Old Essendon", from the title and hook of the principal song performed by a band of supporters which regularly occupied a section of the grandstand at the club's games. The nickname first appeared in print in the local North Melbourne Advertiser in 1889, and ended up gaining wide use, often as the diminutive "Same Olds".

This move away from Essendon, at a time when fans would walk to their local ground, didn't go down too well with many Essendon people; and, as a consequence, a new team and club was formed in 1900, unconnected with the first (although it played in the same colours), that was based at the Essendon Cricket Ground, and playing in the Victorian Football Association. It was known firstly as Essendon Town and, after 1905, as Essendon (although it was often called Essendon A, with the A standing for association).

Return to suburban Essendon (1921–1932) 

After the 1921 season, the East Melbourne Cricket Ground was closed and demolished to expand the Flinders Street Railyard. Having played at the East Melbourne Cricket Ground from 1882 to 1921, and having won four VFA premierships (1891–1894) and four VFL premierships (1897, 1901, 1911 and 1912) whilst there, Essendon was looking for a new home. It was offered grounds at the current Royal Melbourne Showgrounds, Ascot Vale; at Victoria Park, Melbourne; at Arden St, North Melbourne; and the Essendon Cricket Ground. The Essendon City Council offered the (VFL) team the Essendon Cricket Ground, announcing that it would be prepared to spend over £12,000 ($1,009,066 in 2021 terms, according to the Retail Price Index) on improvements, including a new grandstand, scoreboard and re-fencing of the oval.

The club's first preference was to move to North Melbourne—a move which the North Melbourne Football Club (then in the VFA) saw as an opportunity to get into the VFL. Most of Essendon's members and players were from the North Melbourne area, and sportswriters believed that Essendon would have been taken over by or rebranded as North Melbourne within only a few years of the move. However, the VFA, desperate for its own strategic reasons not to lose its use of the North Melbourne Cricket Ground, successfully appealed to the State Government to block Essendon's move to North Melbourne. With its preferred option off the table, the club returned to Essendon, and the Essendon VFA club disbanded, with most of its players moving to North Melbourne.

The old "Same Olds" nickname fell into disuse, and by 1922 the other nicknames "Sash Wearers" and "Essendonians" that had been variously used from time to time were also abandoned. The team became universally known as "the Dons" (from EssenDON); it was not until much later, during the War years of the early 1940s, that they became known as "The Bombers" due to Windy Hill's proximity to the Essendon Aerodrome.

In the 1922 season, playing in Essendon for the first time in decades, Essendon reached the final four for the first time since 1912, finishing in third place. In the 1923 season, the club topped the ladder with 13 wins from 16 games. After a 17-point Second Semi-Final loss to South Melbourne, Essendon defeated Fitzroy (who had beaten South Melbourne) in the 1923 Grand Final (then known as a "Challenge Final" due to its different finals format): Essendon 8.15 (63) to Fitzroy 6.10 (46). Amongst Essendon's best players were half-forward flanker George "Tich" Shorten, centre half-forward Justin McCarthy, centre half-back Tom Fitzmaurice, rover Frank Maher, and wingman Jack Garden. This was one of Essendon's most famous sides, dubbed the "Mosquito Fleet" due to the number of small, very fast players in the side. Six players were 5'6" (167 cm) or smaller.

In the 1924 season, for the first time since their inaugural premiership in 1897, there was no ultimate match to decide the league's champion team – either "Challenge Final" or "Grand Final" – to determine the premiers; instead, the top four clubs after the home-and-away season played a round-robin to determine the premiers. Essendon, having previously defeated both Fitzroy (by 40 points) and South Melbourne (by 33 points), clinched the premiership by means of a 20-point loss to Richmond. With the Tigers having already lost a match to Fitzroy by a substantial margin, the Dons were declared premiers by virtue of their superior percentage, meaning that Essendon again managed to win successive premierships. But the low gates for the finals meant this was never attempted again, resulting in Essendon having the unique record of winning the only two premierships without a grand final.

Prominent contributors to Essendon's 1924 Premiership success included back pocket Clyde Donaldson, follower Norm Beckton, half-back flanker Roy Laing, follower Charlie May, and rover Charlie Hardy. The 1924 season was not without controversy, however, with rumours of numerous players accepting bribes. Regardless of the accuracy of these allegations, the club's image was tarnished, and the side experienced its lowest period during the decade that followed, with poor results on the field and decreased support off it.

There was worse to follow, with various Essendon players publicly blaming each other for a poor performance against Richmond, and then, with dissension still rife in the ranks, the side plummeted to an unexpected and humiliating 28-point loss to VFA premiers Footscray in a special charity match played a week later in front of 46,100 people, in aid of Dame Nellie Melba's Limbless Soldiers' Appeal Fund, purportedly (but not officially) for the championship of Victoria.

The club's fortunes dipped alarmingly—and persistently. Indeed, after finishing third in the 1926 season, it was to be 14 years later—in 1940—before Essendon would even contest a finals series.

Dick Reynolds years (1933–1960) 

After the malaise of the late 1920s and early 1930, the 1933 season proved a turning point in morale despite no finals entries for the entire 1930s. Essendon saw the debut of the player regarded as one of the game's greatest-ever players, Dick Reynolds. His impact was immediate. He won his first Brownlow Medal aged 19. His record of three Brownlow victories (1934, 1937, 1938), equalled Fitzroy's Haydn Bunton, Sr (1931, 1932, 1935), and later equalled by Bob Skilton (1959, 1963, 1968), and Ian Stewart (1965, 1966, 1971).

Reynolds went on to arguably even greater achievements as a coach, a position to which he was first appointed, jointly with Harry Hunter, in 1939 (this was while Reynolds was still a player). A year later he took the reins on a solo basis and was rewarded with immediate success (at least in terms of expectations at the time which, after so long in the wilderness, were somewhat modest). He was regarded as having a sound tactical knowledge of the game and being an inspirational leader, as he led the side into the finals in 1940 for the first time since 1926, when the side finished 3rd. Melbourne, which defeated Essendon by just 5 points in the preliminary final, later went on to trounce Richmond by 39 points in the grand final.

The Essendon Football Club adopted the nickname The Bombers in April 1940.

1941 brought Essendon's first grand final appearance since 1923, but the side again lowered its colours to Melbourne. A year later war broke out and the competition was considerably weakened, with Geelong being forced to pull out of the competition due to travel restrictions as a result of petrol rationing. Attendances at games also declined dramatically, whilst some clubs had to move from their normal grounds due to them being used for military purposes. Many players were lost to football due to their military service. Nevertheless, Essendon went on to win the 1942 Premiership with Western Australian Wally Buttsworth in irrepressible form at centre half-back. Finally, the long-awaited premiership was Essendon's after comprehensively outclassing Richmond in the grand final, 19.18 (132) to 11.13 (79). The match was played at Carlton in front of 49,000 spectators.

In any case, there could be no such reservations about Essendon's next premiership, which came just four years later. Prior to that Essendon lost a hard-fought grand final to Richmond in 1943 by 5 points, finished 3rd in 1944, and dropped to 8th in 1945.

After World War II, Essendon enjoyed great success. In the five years immediately after the war, Essendon won 3 premierships (1946, 1949, 1950) and were runners up twice (1947, 1948). In 1946, Essendon were clearly the VFL's supreme force, topping the ladder after the home-and-away games and surviving a drawn second semi-final against Collingwood to make it through to the grand final a week later with a score of 10.16 (76) to 8.9 (57). Then, in the grand final against Melbourne, Essendon set a grand final record score of 22.18 (150) to Melbourne 13.9 (87), featuring a 7-goal performance by centre half-forward Gordon Lane. Rover Bill Hutchinson, and defenders Wally Buttsworth, Cec Ruddell and Harold Lambert were among the best players.

The 1947 Grand Final has to go down in the ledger as 'one of the ones that got away', with Essendon losing to Carlton by a single point despite managing 30 scoring shots to 21. As if to prove that lightning does occasionally strike twice, the second of the 'ones that got away' came just a year later, the Dons finishing with a lamentable 7.27, to tie with Melbourne (who managed 10.9) in the 1948 grand final. A week later Essendon waved the premiership good-bye, as Melbourne raced to a 13.11 (89) to 7.8 (50) triumph. The club's Annual Report made an assessment that was at once restrained and, as was soon to emerge, tacitly and uncannily prophetic: "It is very apparent that no team is complete without a spearhead and your committee has high hopes of rectifying that fault this coming season."

The 1949 season heralded the arrival on the VFL scene of John Coleman, arguably the greatest player in Essendon's history, and, in the view of some, the finest player the game has known. In his first ever appearance for the Dons, against Hawthorn in Round 1 1949, he booted 12 of his side's 18 goals to create an opening round record which was to endure for forty five years. More importantly, however, he went on to maintain the same high level of performance throughout the season, kicking precisely 100 goals for the year to become the first player to kick 100 goals in a season since Richmond's Jack Titus in 1940.

The Coleman factor was just what Essendon needed to enable them to take that vital final step to premiership glory, but even so it was not until the business end of the season that this became clear. Essendon struggled to make the finals in 4th place, but once there they suddenly ignited to put in one of the most consistently devastating September performances in VFL history.

Collingwood succumbed first as the Dons powered their way to an 82-point first semi-final victory, and a fortnight later it was the turn of the North Melbourne Football Club as Essendon won the preliminary final a good deal more comfortably than the ultimate margin of 17 points suggested. In the grand final, Essendon were pitted against Carlton and in a match that was a total travesty as a contest they overwhelmed the Blues to the tune of 73 points, 18.17 (125) to 6.16 (52). Best for the Dons included pacy aboriginal half-back flanker Norm McDonald, ruckman Bob McLure, and rovers Bill Hutchinson and Ron McEwin. John Coleman also did well, registering 6 majors.

A year later, in 1950, Essendon were—if anything—even more dominant, defeating the North Melbourne Football Club in both the Second Semi-Final and the Grand Final to secure consecutive VFL premierships for the third time. Best afield in the 1950 Grand Final, in what was officially his swan song as a player, was captain-coach Dick Reynolds, who received sterling support from the likes of Norm McDonald, ruckman/back pocket Wally May, back pocket Les Gardiner, and ruckman Bob McLure.

With 'King Richard' still holding court as coach in 1951, albeit now in a non-playing capacity, Essendon seemed on course for a third consecutive flag but a controversial four-week suspension dished out to John Coleman on the eve of the finals effectively put paid to their chances. Coleman was reported for retaliation after twice being struck by his Carlton opponent, Harry Caspar, and without him the Dons were rated a 4 goals poorer team. Nevertheless, they still managed to battle their way to a 6th successive grand final with wins over Footscray by 8 points in the first semi final and Collingwood by 2 points in the preliminary final.

The Dons sustained numerous injuries in the preliminary final, and the selectors sprang a surprise on Grand Final day by naming the officially retired Dick Reynolds as 20th man. 'King Richard' was powerless to prevent the inevitable; although leading at half-time, Geelong kicked five goals to Essendon's two points in the third quarter to set up victory by 11 points.

Essendon slumped to 8th in 1952, but Coleman was in blistering form, managing 103 goals for the year. Hugh Buggy noted in The Argus: "It was the wettest season for twenty-two years and Coleman showed that since the war he was without peer in the art of goal kicking."

Two seasons later, Coleman's career was ended after he dislocated a knee during the Round 8 clash with the North Melbourne Football Club at Essendon. Aged just 25, he had kicked 537 goals in only 98 VFL games in what was generally a fairly low-scoring period for the game. His meteoric rise and fall were clearly the stuff of legend, and few (if any) players, either before or since, have had such an immense impact over so brief a period.

According to Alf Brown, football writer for The Herald:
(Coleman) had all football's gifts. He was courageous, a long, straight kick, he had a shrewd football brain and, above all, he was a spectacular, thrilling mark.

Somewhat more colourful, R.S. Whittington suggested,
"Had he been a trapeze artist in a strolling circus, Coleman could have dispensed with the trapeze."

Without Coleman, Essendon's fortunes plummeted, and there were to be no further premierships in the 1950s. The nearest miss came in 1957 when the Bombers (as they were popularly known by this time) earned premiership favouritism after a superb 16-point Second Semi-Final defeat of Melbourne—only to lose by over 10 goals against the same side a fortnight later.

1959 saw another grand final loss to Melbourne, this time by 37 points, but the fact that the average age of the Essendon side was only 22 was seen as providing considerable cause for optimism. However, it was to take another three years, and a change of coach, before the team's obvious potential was translated into tangible success.

Post-Reynolds era and the "Slugging Seventies" (1961–1980) 
John Coleman started his coaching career at Essendon in 1961, thus ending the Dick Reynolds era at the club. In the same year, Essendon finished the season mid-table, and supporters were not expecting too much for the following season. However, the club blitzed the opposition in 1962, losing only two matches and finishing top of the table. Both losses were to the previous year's grand finalists. The finals posed no problems for the resurgent Dons, easily accounting for Carlton in the season's climax, winning the 1962 Premiership by 32 points. This was a remarkable result for Coleman, who, in just his second season of coaching, claimed the ultimate prize in Australian football. As so often is the case after a flag, the following two years were below standard. A further premiership in 1965 (won from 4th position on the ladder) was also unexpected due to periods of poor form during the 1965 season. The Bombers were a different club when the finals came around, but some of the credit for the improvement was given to the influence of Brian Sampson and Ted Fordham during the finals. Coleman's time as coach turned out to be much like his playing career: highly successful but cut short when he had to stand down due to health problems in 1967. Only six years later, on the eve of the 1973 season, he died of a heart attack at just 44 years of age.

Following Coleman's retirement, the club experienced tough times on and off the field. Finals appearances were rare for the side, which was often in contention for the wooden spoon. Essendon did manage to make the 1968 VFL Grand Final, but it lost to Carlton by just three points and did not make it back to the big stage for a 15 years.

During the period from 1968 until 1980, five different coaches were tried, with none lasting longer than four years. Off the field, the club went through troubled times as well. In 1970, five players went on strike before the season even began, demanding higher payments. Essendon did make the finals in 1972 and 1973 under the autocratic direction of Des Tuddenham (Collingwood), but they were beaten badly in successive elimination finals by St. Kilda and did not taste finals action again until the very end of the decade. The 1970s' Essendon sides were involved in many rough and tough encounters under Tuddenham, who himself came to loggerheads with Ron Barassi at a quarter-time huddle where both coaches exchanged heated words. Essendon had tough but talented players with the likes of "Rotten Ronnie" Ron Andrews and experienced players such as Barry Davis, Ken Fletcher, Geoff Blethyn, Neville Fields and West Australian import Graham Moss. In May 1974, a controversial half-time all-in-brawl with Richmond at Windy Hill and a 1975 encounter with Carlton were testimony of the era. Following the Carlton match, the Herald described Windy Hill as "Boot Hill" because of the extent of the fights and the high number of reported players (eight in all—four from Carlton and four from Essendon). The peak of these incidents occurred in 1980 with new recruit Phil Carman making headlines for head-butting an umpire. The tribunal suspended him for sixteen weeks, and although most people thought this was a fair (or even lenient) sentence, he took his case to the supreme court, gathering even more unwanted publicity for the club. Despite this, the club had recruited many talented young players in the late 1970s who emerged as club greats. Three of those young players were Simon Madden, Tim Watson and Paul Van Der Haar. Terry Daniher and his brother Neale came via a trade with South Melbourne, and Roger Merrett joined soon afterwards to form the nucleus of what would become the formidable Essendon sides of the 1980s. This raw but talented group of youngsters took Essendon to an elimination final in 1979 under Barry Davis but were again thrashed in an Elimination Final, this time at the hands of Fitzroy. Davis resigned at the end of the 1980 season after missing out on a finals appearance.

One of the few highlights for Essendon supporters during this time was when Graham Moss won the 1976 Brownlow Medal; he was the only Bomber to do so in a 40-year span from 1953 to 1993. Even that was bittersweet, as he quit VFL football to move back to his native Western Australia, where Moss finished out his career as a player and coach at Claremont Football Club. In many ways, Moss's career reflects Essendon's mixed fortunes during the decade.

Kevin Sheedy era (1981–2007) 

Former Richmond player Kevin Sheedy started as head coach in 1981.

Essendon reached the Grand Final in 1983, the first time since 1968. Hawthorn won by a then record 83 points.

In 1984, Essendon won the pre-season competition and completed the regular season on top of the ladder. The club played, and beat, Hawthorn in the 1984 VFL Grand Final to win their 13th premiership—their first since 1965. The teams met again in the 1985 Grand Final, which Essendon also won. At the start of 1986, Essendon were considered unbackable for three successive flags, but a succession of injuries to key players Paul Van der Haar (only fifteen games from 1986 to 1988), Tim Watson, Darren Williams, Roger Merrett and Simon Madden led the club to win only eight of its last eighteen games in 1986 and only nine games (plus a draw with Geelong) in 1987. In July 1987, the Bombers suffered a humiliation at the hands of Sydney, who fell two points short of scoring the then highest score in VFL history.

In 1988, Essendon made a rebound to sixth place with twelve wins, including a 140-point thrashing of Brisbane where they had a record sixteen individual goalkickers. In 1989, they rebounded further to second on the ladder with only five losses and thrashed Geelong in the Qualifying Final. However, after a fiery encounter with Hawthorn ended in a convincing defeat, the Bombers were no match for Geelong next week.

In 1990, Essendon were pace-setters almost from the start, but a disruption from the Qualifying Final draw between Collingwood and West Coast was a blow from which they never recovered. The Magpies comprehensively thrashed them in both the second semi final and the grand final.

Following the 1991 season, Essendon moved its home games from its traditional home ground at Windy Hill to the larger and newly renovated MCG. This move generated large increases in game attendance, membership and revenue for the club. The club's training and administrative base remained at Windy Hill until 2013.

Following the retirement of Tim Watson and Simon Madden in the early 1990s, the team was built on new players such as Gavin Wanganeen, Joe Misiti, Mark Mercuri, Michael Long, Dustin Fletcher (son of Ken) and James Hird, who was taken at No. 79 in the 1990 draft. This side became known as the "Baby Bombers", as the core of the side was made up of young players early in their careers.

The team won the 1993 Grand Final against Carlton and that same year, Gavin Wanganeen won the Brownlow Medal, the first awarded to an Essendon player since 1976. Three years later, James Hird was jointly awarded the medal with Michael Voss of Brisbane.

In 2000, the club shifted the majority of its home games to the newly opened Docklands Stadium, signing a 25-year deal to play seven home matches per year at the venue, with the other four remaining at the MCG. The season was one of the most successful by any team in VFL/AFL history, and the club opened with 20 consecutive wins before they lost to the Western Bulldogs in round 21. The team went on to win their 16th premiership, defeating , thereby completing the most dominant single season in AFL/VFL history. The defeat to the Bulldogs was the only defeat for Essendon throughout the entire calendar year (Essendon also won the 2000 pre-season competition).

Essendon was less successful after 2001. Lucrative contracts to a number of premiership players had caused serious pressure on the club's salary cap, forcing the club to trade several key players. Blake Caracella, Chris Heffernan, Justin Blumfield, Gary Moorcroft and Damien Hardwick had all departed by the end of 2002; in 2004, Mark Mercuri, Sean Wellman and Joe Misiti retired. The club remained competitive; however, they could progress no further than the second week of the finals each year for the years of 2002, 2003, and 2004. Sheedy signed a new three-year contract at the end of 2004.

In 2005, Essendon missed the finals for the first time since 1997; and in 2006, the club suffered its worst season under Sheedy, and its worst for more than 70 years, finishing second-last with only three wins (one of which was against defending premiers , in which newly appointed captain Matthew Lloyd kicked eight goals) and one draw from twenty-two games. Lloyd had replaced James Hird as captain at the start of the season, but after suffering a season-ending hamstring injury two weeks after his phenomenal performance against Leo Barry, David Hille was appointed captain for the remainder of the season. The club improved its on-field position in 2007 but again missed the finals.

On field and relocation to Melbourne Airport (2008–2013) 

Sheedy's contract was not renewed after 2007, ending his 27-year tenure as Essendon coach. Matthew Knights replaced Sheedy as coach, and coached the club for three seasons, reaching the finals once—an eighth-place finish in 2009 at the expense of reigning premiers . On 29 August 2010, shortly after the end of the 2010 home-and-away season, Knights was dismissed as coach.

On 28 September 2010, former captain James Hird was named as Essendon's new coach from 2011 on a four-year deal. Former  dual premiership winning coach and Essendon triple-premiership winning player Mark Thompson later joined Hird on the coaching panel. In his first season, Essendon finished eighth. The club started strongly in 2012, sitting fourth with a 10–3 record at the halfway mark of the season; but the club won only one more match for the season, finishing eleventh to miss the finals.

In 2013, the club moved its training and administrative base to The Hangar, a new facility in the suburb of Melbourne Airport which it had developed in conjunction with the Australian Paralympic Committee. Essendon holds a 37-year lease at the facility, and maintains a lease at Windy Hill to use the venue for home matches for its reserves team in the Victorian Football League, and for a social club and merchandise store on the site.

ASADA/WADA investigation (2013–2016) 

During 2013, the club was investigated by the AFL and the Australian Sports Anti-Doping Authority (ASADA) over its 2012 player supplements and sports science program, most specifically over allegations into illegal use of peptide supplements. An internal review found it to have "established a supplements program that was experimental, inappropriate and inadequately vetted and controlled", and on 27 August 2013, the club was found guilty of bringing the game into disrepute for this reason. Among its penalties, the club was fined A$2 million, stripped of early draft picks in the following two drafts, and forfeited its place in the 2013 finals series (having originally finished seventh on the ladder); Hird was suspended from coaching for twelve months. Several office-bearers also resigned their posts during the controversy, including chairman David Evans and CEO Ian Robson.

In the midst of the supplements saga, assistant coach Mark Thompson took over as coach for the 2014 season during Hird's suspension. He led the club back to the finals for a seventh-place finish but in a tense second elimination final against archrivals North Melbourne, the Bombers led by as much as 27 points at half time before a resurgent Kangaroos side came back and won the game by 12 points. After the 2014 season, Mark Thompson left the club to make way for Hird's return to the senior coaching role.

In June 2014, thirty-four players were issued show-cause notices alleging the use of banned peptide Thymosin beta-4 during the program. The players faced the AFL Anti-Doping Tribunal over the 2014/15 offseason, and on 31 March 2015 the tribunal returned a not guilty verdict, determining that it was "not comfortably satisfied" that the players had been administered the peptide.

Hird returned as senior coach for the 2015 season, and after a strong start, the club's form severely declined after the announcement that WADA would appeal the decision of the AFL Anti-Doping Tribunal. The effect of the appeal on the team's morale was devastating and they went on to win only six games for the year. Under extreme pressure, Hird resigned on 18 August 2015 following a disastrous 112-point loss to Adelaide. Former West Coast Eagles premiership coach John Worsfold was appointed as the new senior coach on a three-year contract.

On 12 January 2016 the Court of Arbitration for Sport overruled the AFL anti-doping tribunal's decision, deeming that 34 past and present players of the Essendon Football Club, took the banned substance Thymosin Beta-4. As a result, all 34 players, 12 of which were still at the club, were given two-year suspensions. However, all suspensions were effectively less due to players having previously taken part in provisional suspensions undertaken during the 2014/2015 off-season.
As a result, Essendon contested the 2016 season with twelve of its regular senior players under suspension. In order for the club to remain competitive, the AFL granted Essendon the ability to upgrade all five of their rookie listed players and to sign an additional ten players to cover the loss of the suspended players for the season.

The absence of its most experienced players also allowed the development of its young players, with Zach Merrett and Orazio Fantasia having breakout years, while Darcy Parish and Anthony McDonald-Tipungwuti, impressing in their debut seasons. Merrett acted as captain in the side's round 21 win over the Suns. The club eventually finished on the bottom of the ladder and thus claimed its first wooden spoon since 1933.

Post-investigation (2017–present) 

Essendon made their final financial settlement related to the supplements saga in September 2017, just before finals started.

The 2017 season was also capped off by the retirement of much-loved club legend and ex-captain Jobe Watson, midfielder Brent Stanton, and ex-Geelong star James Kelly, who later took up a development coach role at the club. Midfielder Heath Hocking, who played 126 games for the club, was delisted.

Expectations were high for the 2018 season, with the club having an outstanding offseason. The recruitment of Jake Stringer, Adam Saad and Devon Smith from the Western Bulldogs, Gold Coast Suns and Greater Western Sydney Giants respectively was expected to throw Essendon firmly into premiership contention.

After beating the previous year's runner up  (which went on to beat reigning premiers  the following round) in round one, Essendon's form slumped severely, only winning one game out of the next seven rounds and losing to the then-winless Carlton in round eight. Senior assistant coach Mark Neeld was sacked by the club the following Monday.

The team's form improved sharply after this, recording wins against top eight sides Geelong, GWS, eventual premiers West Coast and Sydney, and winning ten out of the last 13 games of the season. However, the mid-season revival was short-lived, with a loss to reigning premiers  by eight points in round 22 ending any hopes they had of reaching the finals.

The 2018 season was capped off by the club not offering veteran Brendon Goddard a new contract for 2019.

The Bombers had inconsistent form throughout the 2019 season but qualified for the finals for the second time in three seasons, finishing eighth on the ladder with 12 wins and 10 losses. The Bombers, however, were no match for the West Coast Eagles in the first elimination final and lost by 55 points to end their season. The defeat extended their 15-year finals winning drought, having not won a final since 2004.

Following the end of the 2019 season, assistant coach Ben Rutten was announced as John Worsfold's successor as senior coach, effective at the end of the 2020 AFL season. Rutten effectively shared co-coaching duties with Worsfold during the 2020 season.

2020 was a particularly disappointing year for the club. The Bombers failed to make the finals, finishing thirteenth on the AFL ladder with just six wins and a draw from 17 games. Conor McKenna became the first AFL player to test positive to COVID-19 during the pandemic.

With Rutten solely at the helm in 2021, Essendon improved significantly from the previous year and returned to the finals, finishing eighth on the ladder with 11 wins and 11 losses, and despite having beaten the Western Bulldogs towards the end of the regular season, the Bombers would lose to the same team by 49 points in the first elimination final.

2022 was the clubs 150th anniversary, and hopes were high, with some even predicting Essendon to break their 21 year premiership drought. However, these predictions proved drastically wrong as the Bombers went on to finish 15th, winning only 7 games with a percentage of 83.2%. This poor performance placed Rutten's position under scrutiny, and after a late attempt to lure former Hawthorn coach Alastair Clarkson failed, Rutten was unceremoniously sacked. He was replaced by former AFL General Manager of Football and North Melbourne coach Brad Scott. As a result of the 2022 season's turmoil, board members such as former CEO Xavier Campbell, former president Paul Brasher, former player Simon Madden, and Peter Allen left their roles.  Campbell was replaced by Andrew Thorburn, who was resigned after only one day in the role due to his involvement with the conservative City on the Hill Church Movement.

Club symbols

Guernsey 

Essendon's first recorded jumpers were navy blue (The Footballers, edited by Thomas Power, 1875) although the club wore 'red and black caps and hose'. In 1877 The Footballers records the addition of 'a red sash over left shoulder'. This is the first time a red sash as part of the club jumper and by 1878 there are newspaper reports referring to Essendon players as 'the men in the sash'.

Given that blue and navy blue were the most popular colours at the time it is thought that Essendon adopted a red sash in 1877 to distinguish its players from others in similar coloured jumpers.

Clash jumpers 

In 2007, the AFL Commission laid down the requirement that all clubs must produce an alternative jumper for use in matches where jumpers are considered to clash. From 2007 to 2011, the Essendon clash guernsey was the same design as its home guernsey, but with a substantially wider sash such that the guernsey was predominantly red rather than predominantly black. This was changed after 2011 when the AFL deemed that the wider sash did not provide sufficient contrast.

From 2012 to 2016, Essendon's clash guernsey was predominantly grey, with a red sash fimbriated in black; the grey field contained, in small print, the names of all Essendon premiership players.

Before the 2016 season, Essendon's changed their clash guernsey to a predominantly red one, featuring a red sash in black. Similar to the grey jumper, the names of Essendon premiership players were also printed outside the sash.

Yellow armbands 
Following Adam Ramanauskas' personal battle with cancer, a "Clash for Cancer" match against  was launched in 2006. This was a joint venture between Essendon and the Cancer Council of Victoria to raise funds for the organisation. Despite a formal request to the AFL being denied, players wore yellow armbands for the match which resulted in the club being fined $20,000. In 2007, the AFL agreed to allow yellow armbands to be incorporated into the left sleeve of the jumper. The 'Clash for Cancer' match against Melbourne has become an annual event, repeated in subsequent seasons, though in 2012, 2013, 2014 and 2016,  (twice), the Sydney Swans and Brisbane Lions were the opponents in those respective seasons instead of Melbourne. In 2009, the jumpers were auctioned along with yellow boots worn by some players during the match.

Club song 
The club's theme song, "See the Bombers Fly Up", is thought to have been written c. 1959 by Kevin Andrews in the home of player Jeff Gamble at which time Kevin Andrews was living. The song is based on the tune of Johnnie Hamp's 1929 song "(Keep Your) Sunny Side Up" at an increased tempo. Jeff Gamble came up with the line 'See the bombers fly up, up' while Kevin Andrews contributed all or most of the rest. At the time, "(Keep Your) Sunny Side Up" was the theme song for the popular Melbourne-based TV show on Channel 7 Sunnyside Up. The official version of the song was recorded in 1972 by the Fable Singers and is still used today.

The song, as with all other AFL clubs, is played prior to every match and at the conclusion of matches when the team is victorious.

 See the Bombers fly up, up!
 To win the premiership flag.
 Our boys who play this grand old game,
 Are always striving for glory and fame!
 See the Bombers fly up, up,
 The other teams they don't fear;
 They all try their best,
 But they can't get near,
 As the Bombers fly up!

Songwriter Mike Brady, of "Up There Cazaly" fame, penned an updated version of the song in 1999 complete with a new verse arrangement, but it was not well received. However, this version is occasionally played at club functions. In 2018, Andrews revealed that there was an error in the lyrics, in which in the line "The other teams they don't fear", the word "they" was supposed to be "we".

Logo and mascot 
The club's current logo was introduced in 1998, making it the second oldest AFL logo currently in use, behind St. Kilda's logo, which was introduced in 1995.

Their mascot is known as "Skeeta Reynolds", and was named after Dick Reynolds. He is a mosquito and was created in honour of the team's back-to-back premiership sides in the 1920s known as the "Mosquito Fleet". He was first named through a competition run in the Bomber magazine with "Skeeta" being the winning entry. This was later changed to "Skeeta Reynolds". He appears as a red mosquito in an Essendon jumper and wears a red and black scarf.

Headquarters, training and administration base
The Essendon Football Club primary training and administration base has been at The Hangar since 2013. prior to this, the primary training and administration base of Essendon Football Club was based at Windy Hill Oval from 1922 until 2013. prior to this, the home ground of Essendon Football Club was at the East Melbourne Cricket Ground from 1882 until 1921.

Membership

Rivalries 

Matches between the clubs are often close regardless of form and ladder positions. If out of the race themselves, all four have the desire to deny the others a finals spot or a premiership. Essendon also has a fierce rivalry with Hawthorn, stemming from excessive on-field violence in the 1980s, perhaps reaching its zenith with the infamous Line in the Sand Match in 2004. Additionally, Essendon has a three-decade rivalry with the West Coast Eagles.

  – The rivalry between Essendon and Carlton is considered one of the strongest in the league. With the teams sharing the record of 16 premierships, both sides are keen to become outright leader, or if out of the finals race, at least ensure the other doesn't. In recent years, the rivalry has thickened, with Carlton beating the 1999 Minor Premiers and premiership favourites by 1 point in the Preliminary Final. Other notable meetings between the two clubs include the 1908, 1947, 1949, 1962 and 1968 VFL Grand Finals and 1993 AFL Grand Final, with some decided by small margins.
  – In the early days of the VFL, this rivalry grew out of several Grand Final meetings: 1901, 1902 and 1911. The teams didn't meet again in a Grand Final until 1990 when Collingwood won to draw level with the Bombers on 14 premierships and deny the Bombers a chance to join Carlton with 15 flags. Since 1995, the rivalry has been even more fierce, with the clubs facing off against each other annually in the Anzac Day clash, a match which is described as the second biggest of the season (behind only the Grand Final). Being possibly the two biggest football clubs in Victoria, regardless of their position on the ladder, this game always attracts a huge crowd, and it is a match both teams have a great desire to win regardless of either team's season prospects.
  – This rivalry stems out of the 1942 Grand Final which Essendon won. In 1974, a half-time brawl took place involving trainers, officials and players at Windy Hill and has become infamous as one of the biggest ever. The teams didn't meet in the finals between 1944 and 1995, but there have been many close margins in home and away season matches as a result of each team's "never say die" attitude and ability to come back from significant margins in the dying stages of matches. Having met in the AFL's Rivalry Round in (2006 and 2009) and meeting in the Dreamtime at the 'G match since 2005, the rivalry and passion between the clubs and supporters has re-ignited. In recent years the rivalry has been promoted as the "Clash of the Sash".
  – The two sides had a number of physical encounters in the mid-1980s when they were the top two sides of the competition. The rivalry was exacerbated when Dermott Brereton ran through Essendon's three-quarter time huddle during a match in 1988 and again by an all in brawl during a match in 2004 allegedly instigated by Brereton (now known as the Line in the Sand Match after the direction allegedly given by Brereton for the Hawthorn players to make a physical stand). This was reminiscent of the 1980s when battles with Hawthorn were often hard and uncompromising affairs. During Round 22 of the 2009 season, Essendon and Hawthorn played for the last finals spot up for grabs. The teams played out an extremely physical game and despite being 22 points down at half time Essendon went on to win by 17 points. The game included a brawl shortly after half time sparked by Essendon's captain Matthew Lloyd knocking out Hawthorn midfielder Brad Sewell, which led Hawthorn's Campbell Brown to label Lloyd a 'sniper', and promised revenge if Lloyd played on in 2010.
  – One of the fiercest rivalries in the AFL can be traced back to 1896, when several clubs, including Essendon, broke away from the Victorian Football Association to form the Victorian Football League. North sought to join the breakaway competition, but some argue this desire was not realised due to Essendon feeling threatened by North's proximity and the fact their inclusion could drain Essendon of vital talent. More than 100 years later, some North supporters have not forgiven Essendon for the decision and have blamed the Bombers for their small supporter base and gate revenue. North were finally admitted into the VFL in 1925 alongside Footscray and Hawthorn. In 1950, the two sides met in their first and only grand final meeting to date, which Essendon won by 38 points. The rivalry would flare up again in the 1980s. In 1982, the Krakouer brothers, Jim and Phil, led the Roos to an Elimination Final win. Essendon had their revenge a year later, winning a Preliminary Final by 86 points. The rivalry was re-ignited in the late 1990s and early 2000s due to the on-field success of the two sides. In preparation for the 1998 finals series, and despite losing six of their last eight to the Roos, legendary Essendon coach Kevin Sheedy publicly labelled North executives Greg Miller and Mark Dawson soft in response to comments from commentators that his Essendon team was soft. The Kangaroos beat Essendon in the much-hyped encounter that followed (a Qualifying Final), and North fans pelted Sheedy with marshmallows as he left the ground, although Sheedy was seemingly unfazed by the incident, encouraging a "Marshmallow Game" the next year and relishing in the fact that Sheedy's ulterior motive was to build up the game and draw a large crowd, which proved to be correct, drawing in 71,154 people to attend the game. In 2000, the Bombers thrashed North by 125 points. The biggest VFL/AFL comeback of all time occurred between the two teams when Essendon managed to come back from a 69-point deficit to win by 12 points in 2001. A meeting of the two rivals at the MCG in the 2014 AFL finals series in the 2nd Elimination Final resulted in North winning by 12 points.
West Coast – A three-decade rivalry between the Essendon Bombers and the West Coast Eagles kicked off when Essendon coach Kevin Sheedy tied the windsock down on the School End outer terrace so the opposition would not know which way the wind was blowing. Sheedy later said of the incident three decades later, in jest, that it was because the brand sponsor had neglected to pay their account. When West Coast won the toss and kicked against the breeze, it looked as if Sheedy's plan had worked. Nevertheless, West Coast would go on to win by 7 points. In his excitement at winning a close match in Round 16, 1993, with ruckman and forward Paul Salmon kicking a goal 30 seconds before the final siren against the West Coast Eagles (the reigning premiers), Sheedy waved his jacket in the air as he came rushing from the coaches' box. To this day, the supporters of the winning club wave their jackets in the air after the game when the two teams play. The moment is captured in Jamie Cooper's painting the Game That Made Australia, commissioned by the AFL in 2008 to celebrate the 150th anniversary of the sport, with Sheedy shown waving a red, black and yellow jacket rather than a red and black jacket, to reflect Sheedy's support of indigenous footballers. The Bombers would go on to defeat West Coast again later that year in their Semi-Final clash and take home the 1993 premiership cup a couple of weeks later. Despite Sheedy's typically measured disposition, Sheedy did lose his cool on one occasion in 2000. In yet another game against the Eagles, Sheedy was fined $7,500 by the tribunal after making a cut-throat gesture to then-Eagle Mitchell White during the half-time break of the Essendon–West Coast clash in Round 15, 2000, also apparently mouthing the words "You... are... fucked!" to White. In a famous game in 2004, with 35 seconds remaining and the scores deadlocked at 131 points apiece, Essendon legend James Hird swooped on a loose ball in the right forward pocket and snapped a match-winning goal with his 15th possession for the quarter, famously hugging an Essendon supporter in the crowd in a moment of jubilation after being fined $20,000 earlier in the week for criticising umpire Scott McLaren. Full-forward Matthew Lloyd also kicked eight goals during the game to net three Brownlow votes. Despite Hird's incredible individual effort, and to the consternation of fans and the audience of the 2004 Brownlow medal count, he did not receive any Brownlow Medal votes from the umpires for his 34 disposals and clutch goals, which some have speculated was in retribution for his tirade against umpire McLaren.

Organisation and finance

Board 
 For the full list, see List of VFL/AFL presidents
David Barham has served as chairman of the board since August 2022.

Essendon's board members are David Barham, Andrew Welsh, Melissa Verner Green, Dorothy Hisgrove, Andrew Muir, Kate O'Sullivan, and Kevin Sheedy AO.

Sponsorship 
The club's apparel is currently produced by Under Armour. The club's apparel has also been produced by Reebok, Fila, Puma, Adidas and ISC.

Honours 
See Essendon Football Club honours.

Club achievements

Team of the Century 
To celebrate the 125th anniversary of the club, as well as 100 years of the VFL/AFL, Essendon announced its "Team of the Century" in 1997.

Champions of Essendon 
In 2002, a club panel chose and ranked the 25 greatest players to have played for Essendon.

 Dick Reynolds
 John Coleman
 James Hird
 Bill Hutchison
 Simon Madden
 Tim Watson
 Ken Fraser
 Jack Clarke
 Albert Thurgood
 Tom Fitzmaurice
 Terry Daniher
 Wally Buttsworth
 Reg Burgess
 Bill Busbridge
 Barry Davis
 Keith Forbes
 Graham Moss
 Mark Harvey
 Gavin Wanganeen
 Mark Thompson
 John Birt
 Matthew Lloyd
 Michael Long
 Fred Baring
 Harold Lambert

Current squad

Match records 
Highest score: 32.16 (208) v  9.8 (62) – Round 22, 1982, at Western Oval
Lowest score: 0.9 (9) v  6.11 (47) – Round 1, 1899, at Brunswick Street Oval
Lowest score since 1919: 1.12 (18) v  5.5 (35) – Round 10, 1923, at Junction Oval
Highest losing score: Essendon 21.13 (139) v  23.6 (144), Round 22, 1987, M.C.G.
Lowest winning score: Essendon 1.8 (14) v  0.8 (8), Finals Week 3, 1897, Lake Oval (League record)
Lowest winning score since 1919: Essendon 3.10 (28) v Footscray 3.5 (23), Round 13, 1989, Windy Hill
Greatest winning margin: 165 points – Essendon 28.16 (184) v  2.7 (19), Round 18, 1964, Windy Hill
Greatest losing margin: 163 points – Essendon 11.7 (73) v Sydney Swans 36.20 (236), Round 17, 1987, S.C.G.
Record attendance (home-and-away game): 94,825 – 25 April 1995 at MCG v Collingwood (inaugural Anzac Day match)
Record attendance (finals match): 116,828 – 1968 VFL Grand Final v Carlton

Reserves team 
The Essendon reserves team first competed in the Victorian Football League's reserves competition when the competition was established in 1919. The team enjoyed success in the form of eight premierships between 1919 and 1999, including the last Victorian State Football League year in 1999. From 2000 until 2002, the club's reserves team competed in the new Victorian Football League competition.

At the end of 2002, the club dissolved its reserves team and established a reserves affiliation with the Bendigo Football Club in the VFL. The affiliation ran for ten years from 2003 until 2012, allowing reserves players from the Essendon list to play with Bendigo.

The club re-established its reserves team in 2013, seeking greater developmental autonomy. The reserves team has since competed in the VFL. The team plays its home games at Windy Hill. The team is made up of senior-listed AFL players and VFL-contracted players.

From the 2022 VFL season, the side will be coached by former Essendon AFL player Brent Stanton.

 Essendon refused to play the Grand Final in Geelong, so the premiership was awarded to Geelong.

Women's teams

AFL Women's team
Essendon fielded a team in the AFL Women's (AFLW) competition from its seventh season. In March 2022, former  AFLW player and Essendon VFLW captain Georgia Nanscawen was announced as the club's first AFLW player signing, and  AFLW assistant coach Natalie Wood was announced as the club's first AFLW coach a week later. The club's AFLW coaching panel was finalised in late June.

AFL Women's squad

VFL Women's team
Essendon has fielded a team in the VFL Women's (VFLW) competition since the 2018 season. The league is the highest-grade competition for female footballers in Victoria and one of three second-tier female competitions underneath the national AFL Women's.

VFL Women's season summaries

Sources: Club historical data and VFLW stats

Other ventures 
In December 2017, Essendon entered e-sports by acquiring Australian League of Legends team Abyss ESports. This made them the second AFL team to acquire an e-sports division after Adelaide acquired Legacy ESports in May.

On 2 December 2019, it was announced that the Bombers' OPL slot had been sold to Perth-based internet provider Pentanet, marking Essendon's exit from the e-sports arena.

In 2018, the Essendon Football Club, along with four other AFL clubs, entered the Victorian Wheelchair Football League.

See also 

Dreamtime at the 'G
Sport in Australia
Sport in Victoria

Notes

References

External links

 
 "Around the Grounds" – Web Documentary – Windy Hill

 
Australian rules football clubs established in 1871
Australian Football League clubs
Australian rules football clubs in Melbourne
Former Victorian Football League clubs
1871 establishments in Australia
Sport in the City of Moonee Valley